Dominik Hofmann (born September 27, 1986) is an American entrepreneur and programmer. He is best known for being one of the co-founders of Vine as well as being the creator of Peach, Byte and Loot.

Career

Vine 

In June 2012, Hofmann co-founded Vine, which was a 6-second video service with Rus Yusupov and Colin Kroll. Twitter acquired the app in 2012 for $30 million and the app was shut down by Twitter in 2016. During the shutdown process, Hofmann went public with his disagreement on how Vine was handled.

Peach 

In January 2016, Hofmann introduced Peach at the Consumer Electronics Show in Las Vegas. The app received major media attention until Hofmann began to focus less on the app and more on other projects.

Byte 

Byte (formerly dubbed v2) is a 16-second looping video app. The app's purpose is to be the successor app to Vine after its original shutdown. Hofmann was public with his disagreement on how Vine was handled. He has stated the project will be "personally funded" and was released for iOS and Android on January 24, 2020.

Personal life 
Hofmann was born in 1986. He has a younger brother and met Rus Yusupov and Colin Kroll while working at Jetsetter.

References

External links 
 

Living people
1986 births
21st-century American businesspeople
Businesspeople from New York (state)
American Internet celebrities